Baiyangwan Subdistrict is a township-level division of Gusu District, Suzhou, Jiangsu, China.

See also
List of township-level divisions of Suzhou

References

Township-level divisions of Suzhou
Gusu District